Pasteur is both a surname and a given name. Notable people with the name include:

Surname:
Cheryl Pasteur, African-American politician
Louis Pasteur (1822–1895), French chemist and microbiologist
Marie Pasteur (1826 - 1910), Louis Pasteur's wife
Simon Pasteur (born 1985), Cameroonian soccer player
William Pasteur (1855–1943), Swiss-British physician

Given name:
Pasteur Bizimungu (born 1950), President of Rwanda

See also 
 Pasteur (disambiguation)

French-language surnames
Occupational surnames